Gradishtë is a municipality in the Fier County, western Albania. At the 2015 local government reform it became a subdivision of the municipality Divjakë. The population at the 2011 census was 7,521.

The municipal unit comprises the following locations:
Këmishtaj
Mertish
Goricaj
Sopës
Fier-Seman
Gradishtë
Gungas
Spolet
Babunjë

References

Former municipalities in Fier County
Administrative units of Divjakë
Villages in Fier County